Boy Lake Township is a township in Cass County, Minnesota, United States. The population was 132 as of the 2000 census. This township took its name from Boy Lake.

Geography

Unincorporated communities
 Brevik

Lakes
 Aultman Lake
 Boy Lake (west quarter)
 Camp Lake
 Current Lake
 Hougan Lake
 Iverson Lake
 Leech Lake (east edge)
 Mad Dog Lake
 Town Line Lake (north half)

Adjacent townships
 Gould Township (north)
 Boy River Township (northeast)
 Rogers Township (east)
 Inguadona Township (southeast)
 Kego Township (south)
 Pine Lake Township (southwest)

Demographics
As of the census of 2000, there were 132 people, 58 households, and 36 families residing in the township. The population density was 4.8 people per square mile (1.8/km2). There were 204 housing units at an average density of 7.4/sq mi (2.9/km2). The racial makeup of the township was 81.82% White, 0.76% African American, 6.82% Native American, 0.76% Asian, and 9.85% from two or more races. Hispanic or Latino of any race were 1.52% of the population.

There were 58 households, out of which 19.0% had children under the age of 18 living with them, 53.4% were married couples living together, 6.9% had a female householder with no husband present, and 37.9% were non-families. 29.3% of all households were made up of individuals, and 20.7% had someone living alone who was 65 years of age or older. The average household size was 2.28 and the average family size was 2.81.

In the township the population was spread out, with 16.7% under the age of 18, 4.5% from 18 to 24, 22.7% from 25 to 44, 29.5% from 45 to 64, and 26.5% who were 65 years of age or older. The median age was 48 years. For every 100 females, there were 116.4 males. For every 100 females age 18 and over, there were 115.7 males.

The median income for a household in the township was $37,500, and the median income for a family was $36,250. Males had a median income of $34,583 versus $21,250 for females. The per capita income for the township was $20,070. There were 27.8% of families and 26.7% of the population living below the poverty line, including 68.8% of under eighteens and 6.7% of those over 64.

References
 United States National Atlas
 United States Census Bureau 2007 TIGER/Line Shapefiles
 United States Board on Geographic Names (GNIS)

Townships in Cass County, Minnesota
Brainerd, Minnesota micropolitan area
Townships in Minnesota